Urve Kure (August 2 1931 — 7 June 2016) was a former Estonian chess player, who won the Estonian Women's Chess Championship three times - 1953, 1958, 1965.

Biography
In 1950 graduated from secondary school in Tallinn. Urve Kure was one of the strongest women chess players in Estonia in the 1950s and 1960s. In Estonian Chess Championships for women she has won 3 gold (1953, 1958, 1965), 3 silver (1957, 1959, 1964) and 3 bronze (1954, 1961, 1966) medals. Urve Kure three times played for Estonia in Soviet Team Chess Championships (1958, 1960, 1962) and two times played for Estonian team Kalev in Soviet Team Chess Cup (1966, 1968).
All her life worked in the rubber production factory Tegur and other factory Teras.

References

External links
 player profile at olimpbase.org (Soviet Team Chess Championship)
 player profile at olimpbase.org (Soviet Team Chess Cup)

1931 births
2016 deaths
Estonian female chess players
Soviet female chess players
Sportspeople from Tallinn